A blood blister is a type of blister that forms when subdermal tissues and blood vessels are damaged without piercing the skin. It consists of a pool of lymph, blood and other body fluids trapped beneath the skin. If punctured, it suppurates a dark  fluid. Sometimes the fluids are cut off from the rest of the body and dry up, leaving behind dead cell material inside the blister with a texture like putty. Some blood blisters can be extremely painful due to bruising where the blister occurred.

There are also blood blister-like aneurysms as these are known to be located in the supraclinoid internal carotid artery and have been recognized as having unique pathological and clinical features.

Causes 
Blood blisters are commonly caused by accidents in which the skin is pinched by a tool, mechanism, or heavy weight without protective equipment. Blood blisters can also arise from forcible human contact, including grappling. 

Blood blisters also may occur with friction caused by constant rubbing of skin against a surface. Ill-fitting shoes that rub on the skin can cause the blood vessels in the skin to break and form a blood clot under the skin, resulting in a blood blister. Certain sports activities that require repeated movement and rubbing of the skin against equipment may also cause this. So baseball pitchers, rowers, and drummers often contract blood blisters on the fingers and palms. They also form as a result of frostbite.

Blood blisters can also occur in the mouth for a variety of reasons including side effects to certain medications, nutritional deficiencies, and mouth injuries.

Treatment 

There are several methods of healing blood blisters, including elevation of the wound combined with application of a cold pack, and application of padded dressings or splints.

See also

References 

Skin conditions resulting from physical factors